Oak Grove Cemetery, established on January 18, 1856 is a cemetery located in Jerseyville, Illinois, in the northeastern portion of the city. Originally,  were purchased for the cemetery's use. Today, the cemetery covers forty-seven acres.

Notable burials
 Larry Chappell – former Major League Baseball player
 Anthony L. Knapp – U.S. Representative from Illinois
 Robert M. Knapp – U.S. Representative from Illinois

References

External links
 

Cemeteries in Illinois
Protected areas of Jersey County, Illinois
Jerseyville, Illinois
1856 establishments in Illinois